Acrocercops angelica is a moth of the family Gracillariidae. It is known from the Seychelles.

The larvae feed on Calophyllum inophyllum, Hibiscus abelmoschus and Krukoviella obovata. They probably mine the leaves of their host plant.

References

angelica
Moths of Africa
Moths described in 1919
Fauna of Seychelles